Scotiabank Arena, originally named Air Canada Centre (ACC), is the busiest indoor arena in Canada, and it has also been ranked as the 9th busiest music venue in the world in 2016, with 702,516 tickets being sold. The venue has played host to a large number of internationally renowned musicians in the past, spanning a wide range of musical genres. A list of artists who have performed concerts at the venue is included in the table below, while non-concert entertainment events are also added.

Bon Jovi has played 19 dates at the arena until 2017, more than any other artist, and was the first musical act inducted into the ACC Hall of Fame in 2013 (since renamed Scotiabank Arena Hall of Fame).

1999 – 2005

2006

2007

2008 – 2010

2011 – 2020

2021 – present

References 

Entertainment events
Entertainment events in Canada
Events in Toronto
Lists of events by venue
Lists of events in Canada
Entertainment events